The Jharkhand women's cricket team is a women's cricket team that represents the Indian state of Jharkhand. The team competes in the Women's Senior One Day Trophy and the Women's Senior T20 Trophy.

Current squad

Mamta Kanojia
Riya Raj(wk)
Ritu Kumari
Radhey Sonia
Durga Murmu
Mani Niharika
Anamika Kumari
Khushboo Pandey
Pinky Tirky
Dinesh Ashwani
Ravinder Devyani 
Arti Kumari
Priyanka Saiwayan
Shannti Kumari

Honours
 Women's Senior One Day Trophy:
 Runners-up (1): 2020–21

See also
 Jharkhand cricket team

References

Women's cricket teams in India
Cricket in Jharkhand